Bayoba is a village in the Khachmaz Rayon of Azerbaijan. The village forms part of the municipality of Yergüc.

References 

Populated places in Khachmaz District

Bayoba kəndi Xaçmaz rayonun Quba rayonuna yaxın ərazisində yerləşir.Bu kəndin hər tərəfi müxtəlif meyvə bağları ilə əhatə olunmuş füsünkar bir ərazidir.Bayoba kəndi adını 18 əsrin sonıarında yaşamış Bay adlı adamın adıyla bağlıdır.Deyilənlərə görə Bay və onun ailəsi bu kəndə ilk məskən saldıqları üçün kəndin adı Bayoba qalıb.Kiçik bir kəndir təxmini əhali sayı 500-600 nəfər və ev sayı isə təxmini 110-dur.Bayoba kənd məktəbinin adı Qarabağ döyüşlərində qəhramancasına şəhid olmuş Əlvan Fətəliyevin adıyla bağlıdır.Məktəbdə təxmini 120 -yə yaxın şagird təhsil alır.Məktəbin hazırki direktoru Telman Tariverdiyevdir.